Daniel Popovic may refer to:

 Daniel (Montenegrin singer) (born 1955), Montenegro-born Croatian singer
 Daniel Popovic (golfer) (born 1986), Australian golfer